SoftBank presents Dynamite!! USA was a mixed martial arts (MMA) event co-promoted by Fighting and Entertainment Group (FEG), the promoters of K-1 kickboxing events and Hero's MMA events, and EliteXC. The event was held on Saturday, June 2, 2007 at the Los Angeles Memorial Coliseum in Los Angeles, California. Mauro Ranallo, Bill Goldberg, and Jay Glazer did commentary.

Background
The event featured the MMA debut of former professional wrestler Brock Lesnar and the anticipated rematch between Royce Gracie and Kazushi Sakuraba.  The show also featured the MMA debut of NFL wide receiver Johnnie Morton.

The event was aired in two parts in the United States, with three preliminary bouts airing for free on Showtime and a main fight card shown on pay-per-view. In Japan, the card was aired as a two-hour edited broadcast on TBS on June 4, 2007. A condensed one-hour version of the entire event was broadcast on Showtime June 9, 2007. The Pay Per View cost viewers $29.95

Controversy

Pre-fight problems
The event encountered numerous problems and controversies even before it began. FEG had difficulties obtaining a promoter's license, and was only granted a temporary one by the California State Athletic Commission eight days before the event. 

Popular South Korean fighter Hong-Man Choi, initially scheduled to fight Brock Lesnar, was denied a license to fight in the state roughly a week and a half before the event due to medical reasons (later reported to be a tumor on his pituitary gland). K-1 continued to advertise a Lesnar vs. Choi bout up until the day of the fight, despite knowing that it would not occur.  

An originally announced women's bout featuring Jan Finney vs. Gina Carano was canceled on May 16, 2007, when Carano withdrew due to illness. 

Antônio Silva was also removed from the card due to an undisclosed medical condition, and was replaced by Tim Persey. 

An announced match between Ray Sefo and Marvin Eastman was dropped from the card with no explanation given.

Attendance and live gate
On June 7, 2007, the California State Athletic Commission (CSAC) announced that 42,757 tickets were distributed for the event – something promoters say validated the claim of having the largest attendance for a Mixed Martial Arts event in North America (a record previously held by UFC 68). The paid gate for the event was $2,545,590. However, the promoters of the event paid $2,342,500 of that to buy 39,083 tickets to its own event. The final verified paid attendance number for K-1 Dynamite stands at 3,674 which generated $203,090 in revenue.

Post-fight
Fighter Tim Percy tested positive for methamphetamines after his fight, and was suspended by the CSAC.  In addition, Johnnie Morton tested positive for anabolic steroids and Royce Gracie tested positive for Nandrolone, a commonly used anabolic steroid.

Results

Purses

The overall disclosed fighter payroll for the event was $1,057,500.

See also
Elite Xtreme Combat
K-1 Premium Dynamite!!
List of K-1 Events
List of EliteXC events

References

External links
Dynamite!! USA Official Website
Official Discussion
K-1 Official Website
Official EliteXC Website

Elite Xtreme Combat events
K-1 events
Hero's events
2007 in mixed martial arts
Mixed martial arts in Los Angeles
2007 in sports in California